WWGM (93.9 FM, "The FOX") is a radio station broadcasting a rock music format. Licensed to Selmer, Tennessee, United States, the station debuted a new format of rock music and rebranded itself as "939 The Fox". Programming is handled by Mike Brandt of Southern Broadcasting Corporation which also operates sister WYDL in Middleton, Tennessee; and WWFA in St. Florian, Alabama.

As of October 1, 2016, TicTak ended his temporary morning hosting duties and moves to afternoons to make way for a new morning show set to debut October 2016.

Delta Knight hosts evenings, while weekend and mid-day personalities are yet to be named.

The station changed its call sign from WSIB to WWGM on January 9, 2018.

References

External links

WGM
Country radio stations in the United States
McNairy County, Tennessee
Radio stations established in 1992
1992 establishments in Tennessee